The Pavilhão Anexo II is an Angolan state-owned indoor arena located in Complexo Desportivo da Cidadela, Luanda. The arena, with a 1500-seat capacity, is the third to be built in the Cidadela Sports Compound, following the Pavilhão da Cidadela and the Pavilhão Anexo .It has a floating, hardwood flooring and is ready for such sports as Basketball, Handball, Volleyball and Roller Hockey.

See also
 Pavilhão da Cidadela
 Pavilhão Anexo

References

Luanda
Basketball venues in Angola
Volleyball venues in Angola
Handball venues in Angola